Senay is a village and a hamlet of Présilly commune in the Jura département, in the French region of Bourgogne-Franche-Comté. Senay has maximum 8 houses out of which almost half are occupied by same family who own the land around this hamlet.

There is an industrial zone between Senay and Orgelet where famous manufacturers like Verchere Plastiques (plastic manufacturing notably for perfume bottles) and Janod (wooden toys made from the forests of Jura) and even factory for an American engineering company Pulse Engineering (company) (A Technitrol Company) have their establishments.

See also
Communes of the Jura department

References

External links
 Some Photos from "Les Misérables" show at the castle ruins

Geography of Jura (department)
Populated places in Bourgogne-Franche-Comté